EPR may refer to:

Science and technology
 EPR (nuclear reactor), European Pressurised-Water Reactor
 EPR paradox (Einstein–Podolsky–Rosen paradox), in physics
 Earth potential rise, in electrical engineering
 East Pacific Rise, a mid-oceanic ridge
 Electron paramagnetic resonance
 Engine pressure ratio,of a jet engine
 Ethylene propylene rubber
 Yevpatoria RT-70 radio telescope (Evpatoria planetary radar)
 Bernays–Schönfinkel class or effectively propositional, in mathematical logic
 Endpoint references in Web addressing
 Ethnic Power Relations, dataset of ethnic groups
 ePrivacy Regulation (ePR), proposal for the regulation of various privacy-related topics, mostly in relation to electronic communications within the European Union

Medicine
 Enhanced permeability and retention effect, a controversial concept in cancer research
 Emergency Preservation and Resuscitation, a medical procedure
 Electronic patient record

Environment
 UNECE Environmental Performance Reviews, of environmental policies
 Environmental pricing reform
 Extended producer responsibility for environmental costs

Organisations
 EPR Architects, London, UK
 European Platform for Rehabilitation
 Popular Revolutionary Army (Spanish: Ejército Popular Revolucionario), a guerrilla movement in Mexico
 Popular Regular Army (Spanish: Ejército Popular Regular), Spain, 1936
 East Pakistan Rifles, later Border Guards Bangladesh 
 Energy Power Resources, operator of Glanford Power Station

Other uses
 Enlisted Performance Report, USAF evaluation form
 Esperance Airport, Australia, IATA code
 Prabhadevi railway station, India, station code
 Evaluative Proportional Representation electoral systems